Manish Rawat is an Indian politician and a member of the 18th Legislative Assembly in India. He represents the Sidhauli constituency of Uttar Pradesh and is a member of the Bharatiya Janata Party political party.

Early life and  education
Manish Rawat was born in Hardoi district. He attended the University of Lucknow & Dr. Ram Manohar Lohia Avadh University and attained Master of Arts & Bachelor of Education degrees. Rawat belongs to the scheduled caste category.

Political career
Manish Rawat has been a MLA for one term. He represented the Sidhauli constituency and is a member of the Samajwadi Party political party.

Posts held

See also

 Sidhauli (Assembly constituency)
 Sixteenth Legislative Assembly of Uttar Pradesh
 Uttar Pradesh Legislative Assembly

References 

1984 births
Living people
People from Sitapur district
People from Uttar Pradesh
Samajwadi Party politicians
Uttar Pradesh MLAs 2012–2017
Uttar Pradesh politicians
Uttar Pradesh MLAs 2022–2027